Fort C. F. Smith Historic District may refer to:

Fort C. F. Smith Historic District (Fort Smith, Montana), listed on the National Register of Historic Places in Big Horn County, Montana
Fort C. F. Smith Historic District (Arlington, Virginia), listed on the National Register of Historic Places in Arlington County, Virginia